Peritropis is a genus of plant bugs in the family Miridae. There are at least 2 described species in Peritropis.

Species
 Peritropis husseyi Knight, 1923
 Peritropis saldaeformis Uhler, 1891

References

 Thomas J. Henry, Richard C. Froeschner. (1988). Catalog of the Heteroptera, True Bugs of Canada and the Continental United States. Brill Academic Publishers.

Further reading

External links

 NCBI Taxonomy Browser, Peritropis

Cylapinae